Rebel Records is an independent American record label based in Charlottesville, Virginia that specializes in bluegrass and old time music. The label was founded in Mount Rainier, Maryland in 1959 by Dick Freeland, Bill Carroll and Sonny Compton. In 1980, Freeland sold the label to David Freeman, the founder of County Records. Rebel has 140 titles in print from more than 35 different artists and groups. In 2008, the label released 8 new titles, including ones from Ralph Stanley and Larry Sparks.

Notable artists

 Bill Emerson
 Bill Grant and Delia Bell
 Bill Harrell
 Blue Highway
 Butch Baldassari
 Charlie Sizemore
 Chris Jones
 Cliff Waldron
 Cody Kilby
 Dave Evans
 David Davis
 David Parmley
 Del McCoury
 Don Rigsby
 Don Stover
 Forbes Family
 Front Porch String Band
 IIIrd Tyme Out
 J. D. Crowe
 Jimmy Gaudreau
 Joe Greene
 Joe Mullins
 John Starling
 Junior Sisk
 Karl Shiflett
 Keith Whitley
 Kenny Smith
 King Wilkie
 Larry Rice
 Larry Sparks
 Lilly Brothers
 Lost & Found
 Lou Reid
 Mark Newton
 Melvin Goins
 Paul Adkins
 Paul Williams
 Perfect Strangers
 Ralph Stanley II
 Ralph Stanley
 Reno and Smiley
 Rhonda Vincent
 Richard Bennett
 Ricky Skaggs
 Rock County
 Ronnie Bowman
 Seldom Scene
 Stanley Brothers
 Steep Canyon Rangers
 The Country Gentlemen
 Tony Holt
 Tony Rice
 The Traditional Grass

See also
 List of record labels

References

 
Record labels established in 1959
Bluegrass record labels
American independent record labels
Companies based in Virginia